Kenji Takeya (born 7 November 1969) is a Japanese cyclist. He competed in the men's cross-country mountain biking event at the 2004 Summer Olympics.

References

1969 births
Living people
Japanese male cyclists
Olympic cyclists of Japan
Cyclists at the 2004 Summer Olympics
Sportspeople from Tokyo
Cyclists at the 2002 Asian Games
Asian Games medalists in cycling
Medalists at the 2002 Asian Games
Asian Games gold medalists for Japan